Jules Diouf (born 5 March 1992) is a French professional footballer who plays as a defender for F91 Dudelange in Luxembourg.

Club career
Diouf made his debut for Mafra on 21 February 2016 against Leixões in a 1–0 win, playing 90 minutes and scoring one goal.

In June 2016, Diouf signed for Penafiel.

Personal life 
Diouf is of Senegalese descent.

References

External links
 

1992 births
Sportspeople from Neuilly-sur-Seine
Living people
Association football defenders
French footballers
French sportspeople of Senegalese descent
Angoulême Charente FC players
Chabab Rif Al Hoceima players
French expatriate footballers
Expatriate footballers in Morocco
C.D. Mafra players
Expatriate footballers in Portugal
Liga Portugal 2 players
F.C. Penafiel players
Black French sportspeople
Footballers from Hauts-de-Seine